Kraut is an English-language ethnic slur for a German person.

Kraut may also refer to:

Sauerkraut, a cabbage dish
Kraut, German for cabbage or herb
Kraut (surname)
Kraut (band), a punk rock band from New York City
Kraut, the b-side song on the Juke Joint Jezebel single by industrial rock group KMFDM 
Kraut Canyon, a valley in New Mexico